Rafael Alfredo Blancq Cazaux (born 16 February 1998) is an Argentine professional footballer who plays as a winger for Greek Super League 2 club Ierapetra.

Career
Blancq is a product of the Argentinos Juniors youth system, having previously progressed through local team CSyD Victoria and Boca Juniors. In January 2020, Blancq completed a loan move to Venezuela with GV Maracay. He made his professional debut for the newly-promoted Primera División outfit on 8 February, coming off the bench during a goalless draw against Yaracuyanos at the Estadio Florentino Oropeza. His first start arrived on 22 February versus Metropolitanos, while the winger scored his first senior goal in a 6–2 defeat to Caracas on 23 November.

Career statistics
.

References

External links

1998 births
Living people
People from Curuzú Cuatiá
Argentine footballers
Association football forwards
Argentine expatriate footballers
Expatriate footballers in Venezuela
Argentine expatriate sportspeople in Venezuela
Venezuelan Primera División players
Argentinos Juniors footballers
Gran Valencia Maracay F.C. players
Sportspeople from Corrientes Province